Safiabad (also Romanized as Şafīābād) is a village in Shahsavan Kandi Rural District, in the Central District of Saveh County, Markazi Province, Iran. At the 2006 census, its population was 45, in 20 families.

References 

Populated places in Saveh County